Sarmila Bose is an Indian-American journalist and academic. She has served as a senior research associate at the Centre for International Studies in the Department of Politics and International Relations at the University of Oxford. She is the author of Dead Reckoning: Memories of the 1971 Bangladesh War, a controversial book on the Bangladesh Liberation War.

Early life and education 
Bose belongs to an ethnic Bengali family with extensive involvement in national politics in India. She is the grandniece of Indian nationalist Subhas Chandra Bose, granddaughter of nationalist Sarat Chandra Bose, and daughter of former Trinamool Congress parliamentarian Krishna Bose and paediatrician Sisir Kumar Bose.

Bose was born in Boston in 1959, but grew up in Calcutta, India, where she attended Modern High School for Girls. 

She returned to the US for higher studies. She obtained a bachelor's degree in history from Bryn Mawr College, a master's degree in public administration from the Harvard Kennedy School, and a PhD in Political Economy and Government from Harvard University. 

After her doctorate, she has held teaching and research positions at Harvard University, Warwick University, George Washington University, Tata Institute of Social Sciences, and Oxford University. She has also worked in journalism, writing in both Bengali and English.

Works 
In her book, Dead Reckoning: Memories of the 1971 Bangladesh War, Bose claims that atrocities were committed by both sides in the 1971 Bangladesh War, but that memories of the atrocities had been "dominated by the narrative of the victorious side", pointing to Indian and Bangladeshi "myths" and "exaggerations" which were not historically or statistically plausible. While the book does not exonerate the West Pakistani forces, it claims that the army officers "turned out to be fine men doing their best to fight an unconventional war within the conventions of warfare". The book was criticized by Columbia University professor Naeem Mohaiemen in BBC  and Economic & Political Weekly for ahistorical bias in sources. She has responded to three of her critics — Naeem Mohaiemen, Urvashi Butalia, and Srinath Raghavan.

She has also authored Money, Energy, and Welfare: the state and the household in India's rural electrification policy, published by Oxford University Press in 1993.

Personal life and family 
Bose has trained in Indian music and has performed in Calcutta.

Bose's brother, Sumantra Bose, teaches at the London School of Economics. Her brother Sugata Bose has been a member of Indian parliament since 2014.

External Links 

 Official Website

References

1959 births
Indian writers
Indian women writers
21st-century Indian writers
Bengali Hindus
20th-century Bengalis
21st-century Bengalis
20th-century Indian scholars
Indian journalists
21st-century Indian journalists
Indian women journalists
Indian historians
Bengali historians
Indian women historians
20th-century Indian historians
21st-century Indian historians
Indian historical novelists
21st-century Indian novelists
West Bengal academics
Indian women novelists
Indian women non-fiction writers
21st-century Indian non-fiction writers
Indian scholars
Indian women scholars
Living people
American women writers of Indian descent
American people of Bengali descent
Bryn Mawr College alumni
Harvard Graduate School of Arts and Sciences alumni
American emigrants to England
English people of Indian descent
Academics of the University of Oxford
Writers from Boston
Writers from Kolkata
Women writers from West Bengal
American women academics
Harvard Kennedy School alumni